The NCAA Division III Football Championship began in 1973.

The Division III playoffs begin with 32 teams selected to participate in the Division III playoffs. The Division III championship game, known as the Amos Alonzo Stagg Bowl or Stagg Bowl (named after Amos Alonzo Stagg), will be held at Navy–Marine Corps Memorial Stadium on the grounds of the United States Naval Academy in Annapolis, Maryland in 2022, with sites selected through 2025. The championship game was previously held at Tom Benson Hall of Fame Stadium in Canton, Ohio (2021), Woodforest Bank Stadium in Shenandoah, Texas (2018–2019), Salem Football Stadium in Salem, Virginia (1993–2017), at Hawkins Stadium in Bradenton, Florida (1990–1992), Garrett-Harrison Stadium in Phenix City, Alabama (1973–1982, 1985–1989), and at Galbreath Field at the College Football Hall of Fame, when the Hall was located in Kings Island, Ohio (1983–1984).

West and East Regional Championships (1969–1972)
In 1969, the NCAA started two regional championship games for small college teams: the East Regional's Knute Rockne Bowl and the West's Amos Alonzo Stagg Bowl. When the NCAA developed a national Division III championship game in 1973, the Stagg Bowl name and the host city of Phenix City, Alabama was chosen.

West Regional championship (Amos Alonzo Stagg Bowl)

East Regional championship (Knute Rockne Bowl)

National championship games

§ - On October 10, 2019, the NCAA vacated the 2016 championship due to violations self-reported by UMHB. The appeal was unsuccessful, therefore there was no champion declared for the 2016 season. In late June 2020, UMHB's 2016 and 2017 seasons' wins and records were also vacated.

National championships by team

§ October 10, 2019 the NCAA vacated the 2016 championship due to violations self-reported by Mary Hardin–Baylor. The appeal was unsuccessful, therefore there was no champion declared for the 2016 season. Mary Hardin–Baylor also had its wins and records from that season and in 2017 vacated.

Championship game appearances

Programs that no longer compete in Division III are indicated in italics with a pink background.

Of the programs that no longer compete in D-III, West Georgia is the only one that is currently in Division II. All others compete in Division I FCS.

Stagg Bowl Most Outstanding Player Award
As voted by the media at the game since 2000.

See also
 List of NCAA Division III football programs
 List of NCAA Division III Football Championship appearances by team
 List of NCAA Division I FBS football bowl records
 List of NCAA Division I FCS playoff appearances by team
 List of NCAA Division II Football Championship appearances by team
 List of NAIA National Football Championship Series appearances by team

References

Sources
 NCAA Division III National Football Championship history from NCAA.org
 NCAA Division III Football Championships Records Book from NCAA.org
 Division III football playoff history from d3football.com

Division III
 
American football in Virginia